Maximilian Zaiser (born 8 March 1999) is a German footballer who plays as a midfielder for Regionalliga Bayern club Würzburger Kickers.

Professional career
Zaiser made his professional debut with FC Bayern Munich II in a 1–1 3. Liga draw with Eintracht Braunschweig on 6 June 2020.

On 14 June 2022, Zaiser signed with recently relegated Regionalliga Bayern club Würzburger Kickers.

Career statistics

References

External links
 
 DFB Profile
 FC Bayern Profile

Living people
1999 births
People from Rosenheim
Sportspeople from Upper Bavaria
Association football midfielders
German footballers
FC Bayern Munich II players
TSG 1899 Hoffenheim II players
Würzburger Kickers players
3. Liga players
Regionalliga players
Footballers from Bavaria